The 2003 MAAC men's basketball tournament was held March 7–10 at Sovereign Bank Arena in Trenton, New Jersey.

Top-seeded Manhattan defeated  in the championship game, 69–54, to win their second MAAC men's basketball tournament.

The Jaspers received an automatic bid to the 2003 NCAA tournament.

Format
All ten of the conference's members participated in the tournament field. They were seeded based on regular season conference records.

As the regular-season champion, top seed Manhattan received a bye to the semifinals.

Bracket

References

MAAC men's basketball tournament
2002–03 Metro Atlantic Athletic Conference men's basketball season